Old Colleton County Jail is a historic library building located at Walterboro, Colleton County, South Carolina. It was built in 1856, and is a stuccoed brick building in the Gothic Revival style. The building was designed by noted Charleston architects, Edward C. Jones and Francis D. Lee. The jail in part resembles a miniature, fortified castle. The front façade has crenellated parapets, turret-like structures at either corner, and a massive central tower with a large lancet window above the main entrance.

It was listed in the National Register of Historic Places in 1971.

References

Jails on the National Register of Historic Places in South Carolina
Gothic Revival architecture in South Carolina
Government buildings completed in 1856
Buildings and structures in Colleton County, South Carolina
National Register of Historic Places in Colleton County, South Carolina
Jails in South Carolina
1856 establishments in South Carolina